The bulldog rat (Rattus nativitatis) is an extinct species of rat formerly endemic to Christmas Island in the Indian Ocean. It was one of two rats endemic to Christmas Island, alongside Maclear's rat.

Description 
They have been estimated to weigh . Their hair was described as being thick, coarse and dark reddish-brown in colour, with a slightly lighter underside. Despite being traditionally thought to be a part of the genus Rattus, the bulldog rat is now thought to be nested within Bunomys, a genus otherwise endemic to Sulawesi and the surrounding islands.

Life history 
The rats lived on the higher hills and denser forests of the island. They lived in small colonies, in burrows among the roots of trees or under hollow logs of sago palms in primary forest. They were sluggish and never climbed. Bulldog rats have been suggested to have been half-dazed in daylight and were strictly nocturnal.

Extinction 
The last record dates from 1903. They are suggested to have succumbed to a disease brought by black rats that had been inadvertently introduced by sailors, as mass die-offs are noted around 1902–1903, after which they were never seen again.

References

Further reading
 

Rattus
Fauna of Christmas Island
Rodents of Asia
Extinct rodents
Extinct animals of Australia
Species made extinct by human activities
Rodent extinctions since 1500
Mammals described in 1888
Taxa named by Oldfield Thomas
1903 in the environment